Lifecasting is a ballet choreographed by Douglas Lee for the New York City Ballet to the third movement of Ryoji Ikeda's Opus 1 (2000–2001) and Steve Reich's Triple Quartet (1998). The premiere took place on Thursday, 22 January 2009 at the David H. Koch Theater, Lincoln Center. Lee has previously made dances for City Ballet’s New York Choreographic Institute. Costumes were designed by Ines Alda and lighting by Mark Stanley.

Original cast
 Ashley Bouder
 Sterling Hyltin
 Maria Kowroski
 Kaitlyn Gilliland
 Georgina Pazcoguin
 Antonio Carmena
 Robert Fairchild
 Craig Hall
 Amar Ramasar
 Adrian Danchig-Waring
 Christian Tworzyanski

See also 
 List of ballets by title

Footnotes 

Ballets to the music of Steve Reich
2009 ballet premieres
New York City Ballet repertory
Ballets designed by Ines Alda